Phillip Pacetti known as "Philonious" is an American musician active in the 1990s to present.

"Philonious" is a vocalist, guitarist, lyricist, songwriter and music producer who began his musical journey in the early 1990s with the Los Angeles band Grumblefish.  The band was produced by Jonathan Melvoin (drummer for The Dickies, and Prince and The Revolution) Jonathan was the drummer on their debut album and performed at local shows with the band in Los Angeles for one year before recruiting Mark Aber Rooney, the son of Mickey Rooney and Jan Rooney.  Grumblefish was a staple of the LA music scene and released three albums before disbanding in 1996. Philonious studied voice at Musician's Institute in Los Angeles, CA, and was cited by friends and fellow musicians for his tremendous vocal range in his early years.  He fronted the band Self Destructing Messengers which disbanded after their last performance in August 2010.

His experience working in various studios in Los Angeles, CA, Dallas, TX and Nashville, TN with the likes of Emmy Award winning sound designer/composer, Leonard Wolf revived his interest audio engineering.  He is currently recording and producing underground bands in Raleigh, NC.  In 2016 he founded a non-profit, musical collective called, Poisoned Apple Recordings, Inc as a platform for musical artists in the Raleigh, NC artist community.

References

External links
http://www.poisonedapplerecordings.org/
Midtown music and arts festival
events.wkrg.com
modmobilian.com
zvents.com

American rock singers
American rock musicians
Songwriters from Alabama
Musicians from Mobile, Alabama
Living people
Musicians Institute alumni
Year of birth missing (living people)